Haddadi is a surname. Notable people with the surname include:

Ehsan Haddadi (born 1985), Iranian discus thrower
Hamed Haddadi (born 1985), Iranian basketball player
Oussama Haddadi (born 1992), Tunisian footballer

See also
Dendropsophus haddadi, a species of frog